Logan Museum of Anthropology is a museum of Beloit College, located in Beloit, Wisconsin, United States. It was founded in 1894 by Beloit trustee and patron of the arts Frank Granger Logan and contains about 300,000 archaeological and ethnological objects from around the world. Its collections and exhibitions relate to indigenous cultures of the Western Hemisphere, Oceania, and other parts of the world, including European and North African Paleolithic cultures. The Logan Museum was accredited by the American Alliance of Museums in 1972 and again in 2007.

References

External links
Official website
Digital Collections

Museums in Rock County, Wisconsin
Buildings and structures in Beloit, Wisconsin
Natural history museums in Wisconsin
Institutions accredited by the American Alliance of Museums
University museums in Wisconsin
Anthropology museums in the United States
Beloit College
Museums established in 1894
1894 establishments in Wisconsin